Gordon Lam Ka-tung (林家棟; born 21 September 1967) is a Hong Kong actor, film producer and screenwriter. Initially known for his supporting roles in films directed by Andrew Lau and Johnnie To,  Lam eventually became a lead actor in the Hong Kong film industry, appearing in the 2013 box office hit, Firestorm, and the Hong Kong Film Award-winning 2016 film, Trivisa, which also netted him the Hong Kong Film Award for Best Actor.

Career
Lam graduated from TVB's 15th Artist Training Class in 1988. For the next seven to eight years, he was no more than an extra in most television productions. It wasn't until Lam's impersonation of Jacky Cheung that he began to catch the attention of Hong Kong audiences.

Lam was soon offered more supporting roles and the first TV series he starred in, Time Before Time, was one of the most popular serials of 1997. At that time, he has had the opportunity to appear in films as well, with small roles in Gen-X Cops (1999) and The Kid (1999).  After leaving TVB in 2001, Lam became a contracted artiste under Andy Lau's Topman Global, and began to fully concentrate on his film career. Lam appeared in supporting roles in a number of Lau's films such as Dance of a Dream (2001), Infernal Affairs (2002), Jiang Hu (2004), Yesterday Once More (2004) and Wait 'til You're Older (2005). Some of his other known film appearances include Johnnie To's Election film series (2005-2006), Exiled (2006) and Mad Detective (2007). 

In 2009, Lam made his debut as a producer for Gallants, which won the Hong Kong Film Award for Best Film as well as the Hong Kong Film Critics Society Awards for Best Film. Lam went on to producer the 2015 film, Get Outta Here, which he also wrote the story for.

In 2013, Lam played a subsidiary role in Lau's 2013 film, Firestorm, which was a box office success, and subsequently led him to many leading film role offers.

In 2017, Lam won the Hong Kong Film Award for Best Actor for his performance in as Kwai Ching-hung Trivisa (2016), based on real life notorious Hong Kong mobster Kwai Ping-hung. His performance also won him the Hong Kong Film Critics Society Awards for Best Actor and the Hong Kong Film Directors' Guild Award for Best Actor.

On 6 August 2021, Lam received the Variety Star Asia Award at the 20th New York Asian Film Festival.

Filmography

Film

Actor

Producer

Writer

TV series

Awards and nominations

References

External links

Living people
TVB veteran actors
1967 births
20th-century Hong Kong male actors
21st-century Hong Kong male actors
Hong Kong male television actors
Hong Kong male film actors